Raptors Basketball Academy, better known as Raptors, is a Nigerian basketball team based in Lagos. It plays in the Nigerian Premier League.

The team was founded in 2001 by coach Charles Ibeziakor as Spiders. In 2006, he changed the name to Raptors as a reference to the Toronto Raptors. In the 2019 season, the Raptors made their debut in the Premier League. In its debut season, Raptors reached the final of the 2019 NBBF President Cup after beating Niger Potters in the semifinals. In the final, the team lost to Rivers Hoopers.

Honours
Nigerian Premier League
Runners-up (1): 2019
OBN Hoop Summit

 Winners (1): 2022

Head coaches
 Charles Ibeziakor (2001–now)

References

External links
Facebook page
Twitter profile

Basketball teams in Nigeria
Sport in Lagos